Minor Basilica of the Immaculate Conception (Spanish: Basílica Menor de la Inmaculada Concepción) is a minor basilica in Batangas City, Philippines. It was made an independent parish in 1614 under the advocation of the Immaculate Conception.

The church is temporarily closed to the public after it was severely affected by the 2017 Batangas earthquakes. The venerated Marian image was granted a decree of canonical coronation by Pope Francis on 14 March 2022, and was crowned later by the Apostolic Nuncio to the country, Archbishop Charles John Brown on 8 December the same year.

History

Earlier churches
Catholic priest Father Diego de Mojica was said to have constructed the first temporary church made of light materials in 1578. The church was put under the title of the Immaculate Conception. The church was burned down by the fire that gutted the whole town in 1615. 
In 1686, Father Jose Rodriguez began laying the new foundation of a new church made of stone. The main nave was finished in the same year with the help of Father Manuel del Buensuceso and the townspeople. 
Fr. Jose de San Bartolome completed the transept made of reef stone on 1706, and it was blessed in 1721. The church was gutted by fire again after a lightning bolt in 1747 and was repaired in 1756 during the time of Don Ramon Orendain.

Present church
The former Father Provincial, Fr. Pedro Cuesta, demolished the old church which he found too small for the increasing population of the town and started the construction of the new one on the same site in 1851. He also built the strong fence of the atrium to enclose the church and convent. The church was damaged by earthquake in 1863 and repaired and reinforced with walls and buttresses. After the roof fell in 1880, it was repaired in 1884 by Fr. Bruno Laredo. The convent built in 1693, of reef stone and huge molave post withstood all the earthquakes until Fr. Melchor Fernández constructed a new one in 1792. It was later used as a school building by the Saint Bridget College. Later on, the second floor of the convent was demolished and was converted into a parish pastoral hall.

The church has undergone several restorations. The second and third stories of the belfry was completed in 1934. In 1936, old windows were changed and 23 chandeliers were added. The façade collapsed during the April 8, 1942 earthquake and was repaired between 1945 and 1946. In 1954, the exterior was painted with general repairs in 1957. The exterior was beautified and the frescoes were retouched on the occasion of the centennial celebration.

On February 13, 1945, the church was declared a minor basilica of the Immaculate Conception. The declaration was made upon the request of Lipa's bishop, Alfredo Verzosa.

On January 16, 2022, the Basilica was also declared as the Archdiocesan Shrine of Santo Niño de Batangan.

The venerated Marian image enshrined was granted a decree of canonical coronation by Pope Francis on 14 March 2022. The coronation rites were held on 8 December of the same year.

References

External links

Roman Catholic churches in Batangas
Basilica churches in the Philippines
Marked Historical Structures of the Philippines
Historic sites in the Philippines
Buildings and structures in Batangas City
Roman Catholic churches completed in 1857
Churches in the Roman Catholic Archdiocese of Lipa
19th-century religious buildings and structures in the Philippines